Powder Magazine, Powder House, or Powderworks may refer to:

Powder tower or powder house, a building used to store gunpowder or explosives; common until the 20th century
Gunpowder magazine, a building designed to store gunpowder in wooden barrels; historical successor to the above
Magazine (artillery), an item or place within which ammunition or other explosive material is stored

Structures in the United States
Alphabetical by state or territory, then by town or city
Powder Magazine (Montgomery, Alabama), on the National Register of Historic Places (NRHP) listings in Montgomery County, Alabama
Powder Magazine (Blue Ball, Arkansas), NRHP-listed
Powder Magazine (Camp Drum), Los Angeles, California
Sanchez Powder House Site, St. Augustine, Florida, NRHP-listed
Confederate Powderworks, Augusta, Georgia
Camp Parapet Powder Magazine, Metairie, Louisiana, NRHP-listed
Powder House Square, a neighborhood and landmark rotary in Somerville, Massachusetts
Powder House Park, Somerville, Massachusetts, NRHP-listed
Powder House Island, an artificial island in the Detroit River, Michigan
Hessian Powder Magazine, Carlisle, Pennsylvania, NRHP-listed
Logans Ferry Powder Works Historic District, Plum Borough, Pennsylvania, NRHP-listed
Polvorín de Miraflores, San Juan, Puerto Rico, NRHP-listed
Fort Johnson (South Carolina) Powder Magazine, NRHP-listed
Powder Magazine (Charleston, South Carolina), a U.S. National Historic Landmark and NRHP-listed
Jefferson Ordnance Magazine, Jefferson, Texas, NRHP-listed
Civilian Conservation Corps Powder Magazine, Torrey, Utah, NRHP-listed

Other uses 
 "Powderworks" (song), by Midnight Oil, 1978
Powder Magazine (skiing), a snow-skiing magazine for which John Bresee was a writer and managing editor